John Morton (born May 18, 1967) is a retired American professional basketball player and current assistant coach at Saint Peter's University.

College playing career
Morton played college basketball at Seton Hall University, with the Seton Hall Pirates, from 1985 to 1989.

Professional playing career
Morton was picked in the first round of the 1989 NBA Draft. He played for only three NBA seasons (1990–1992), playing with the Cleveland Cavaliers and the Miami Heat. He averaged 4.8 points, 1.3 rebounds, and 2.7 assists per game.

Coaching career
Morton worked as an assistant basketball coach at Fordham in 2010. In 2018, Morton was hired as an assistant coach for Saint Peter's University.

References

External links
John Morton NBA statistics - basketballreference.com
Fordham coaching bio

1967 births
Living people
African-American basketball players
American expatriate basketball people in Italy
American expatriate basketball people in the Philippines
American expatriate basketball people in Spain
American men's basketball coaches
American men's basketball players
Basketball coaches from New York (state)
Basketball players from New York City
CB Gran Canaria players
CB Granada players
CB Peñas Huesca players
Cleveland Cavaliers draft picks
Cleveland Cavaliers players
Fordham Rams men's basketball coaches
Joventut Badalona players
Liga ACB players
Miami Heat players
Point guards
Rapid City Thrillers players
Richmond Rhythm players
Saint Peter's Peacocks men's basketball coaches
Seton Hall Pirates men's basketball players
Shell Turbo Chargers players
Sportspeople from the Bronx
Philippine Basketball Association imports
21st-century African-American people
20th-century African-American sportspeople